Kabira Uddina Ahmed is a Bangladesh Nationalist Party politician and a Member of Parliament from Kishoreganj-4.

Career
Ahmed was elected to parliament from Kishoreganj-4 as an Bangladesh Nationalist Party candidate in February 1996.

References

Bangladesh Nationalist Party politicians
Year of birth missing (living people)
6th Jatiya Sangsad members